Niculae is a Romanian given name and surname. Notable people with it include:

Given name 
Niculae Cocea (1880–1949), Romanian journalist, novelist, critic and left-wing political activist
Niculae-Cornel Crăciun (born 1925), Romanian Nordic skier
Niculae Conovici (1948–2005, Bucharest), Romanian archeologist, amphorologist and numismat
Niculae Flocea (born 1987), Romanian sprint canoer
Niculae Fulgeanu (born 1971), Romanian former water polo player
Nicolae I. Herescu (1906–1961), Romanian classical scholar, essayist, translator and poet
Niculae M. Popescu (1881–1963),  Romanian theologian, historian and priest of the Romanian Orthodox Church
Niculae Nedeff (1928–2017), Romanian handballer
Nicolae Pătrașcu (ca. 1580–late 1627), Rulers of Wallachia
Niculae Zamfir (born 1958), Romanian wrestler

Surname 
Constantin Niculae (born 1955), Romanian judoka
Daniel Niculae (born 1982), Romanian Footballer
Ioan Niculae (born 1954), Romanian businessman and entrepreneur
Marius Niculae (born 1981), Romanian footballer

Romanian masculine given names
Romanian-language surnames